Maritalea porphyrae is a Gram-negative, aerobic, motile bacterium from the genus of Maritalea which was isolated from the alga Porphyra yezoensis.

References

External links
Type strain of Maritalea porphyrae at BacDive -  the Bacterial Diversity Metadatabase

Hyphomicrobiales
Bacteria described in 2012